Brian James Doyle (born April 7, 1950) is a former Deputy Press Secretary in the United States Department of Homeland Security. In 2006, he was indicted for seducing a 14-year-old girl, who was actually a sheriff's deputy working undercover, on the internet. He was arrested on April 4, 2006, at his home in Silver Spring, Maryland. Five months later, he pled no contest.  On November 17, 2006, he was sentenced to five years in prison, with ten years of probation, and he was registered as a sex offender.  Doyle was incarcerated at Wakulla Correctional Institution Annex outside of Tallahassee, Florida.  He was released from prison on January 15, 2011.

See also 
John Atchison
 List of federal political sex scandals in the United States

References

External links 

 State of Florida vs. Brian J. Doyle at findlaw
 Brian J. Doyle's entry at Florida Sex Offender Registry

1950 births
American government officials convicted of crimes
American prisoners and detainees
American public relations people
Living people
People from Silver Spring, Maryland
People from Wilkes-Barre, Pennsylvania
Prisoners and detainees of Florida